The following is a partial list of University of Toronto faculty, including current, former, emeritus, and deceased faculty, and administrators at University of Toronto.

To avoid redundancy, alumni who hold or have held faculty positions in the University of Toronto are placed on the list of alumni, and do not appear on this list of faculty.

Natural sciences and mathematics

Mathematics

Medicine and dentistry

Physics, chemistry and astronomy

Biology and ecology

Engineering and computer science

Earth science

Social sciences

Anthropology and geography

Sociology and psychology

Economics, management and political science

Humanities

Philosophy and classics

Literature and linguistics

History

Law

Religious studies

Fine arts, music, drama and architecture
Charles William Jefferys (professor of architecture, 1912–39) – painter and historical illustrator; co-founder of the Canadian Society of Graphic Art with Ivor Lewis
Eric Arthur (professor of architecture 1923–66) – architect, member of the "Toronto's Hundred Years" Publication Committee, which published Toronto's 100 Years
H. Allen Brooks (professor of the history of art) – architectural historian known for research on Frank Lloyd Wright, the Prairie School and Le Corbusier
Baņuta Rubess (professor of drama, 2011–) – playwright and director
Michelle Mohabeer (professor of film) – filmmaker and writer
Djanet Sears (professor of drama, 2000–) – playwright, actor and director, won four Dora Mavor Moore Awards and one Governor General's Award

Education

Business and public policy

References

University of Toronto people
Toronto
Toronto-related lists